The genus Pritchardia (family Arecaceae) consists of between 24 and 40 species of fan palms (subfamily Coryphoideae) found on tropical Pacific Ocean islands in Fiji, Samoa, Tonga, Tuamotus, and most diversely in Hawaii. The generic name honors William Thomas Pritchard (1829-1907), a British consul at Fiji.

Description
The leaves are fan-shaped (costapalmate) and the trunk columnar, naked, smooth or fibrous, longitudinally grooved, and obscurely ringed by leaf scars. The flowers and subsequent fruit are borne in a terminal cluster with simple or compound branches of an arcuate or pendulous inflorescence that (in some species) is longer than the leaves.

Species
There are 29 known species, of which 19 are endemic to the Hawaiian Islands, with the remainder on other island groups.

 Pritchardia affinis Becc. – Hawaii Pritchardia (Island of Hawaii)
 Pritchardia arecina Becc. – Maui Pritchardia (Maui, Hawaii)
 Pritchardia aylmer-robinsonii H.St.John (Niihau, Hawaii)
 Pritchardia beccariana Rock – Kilauea Pritchardia (Island of Hawaii)
 Pritchardia flynnii 
 Pritchardia forbesiana Rock – Mt. Eke Pritchardia (Maui, Hawaii)
 Pritchardia glabrata Becc. & Rock (Maui, Hawaii)
 Pritchardia hardyi Rock – Makaleha Pritchardia (Kauai, Hawaii)
 Pritchardia hillebrandii (Kuntze) Becc. (Native range uncertain, but believed to be Molokai, Hawaii)
 Pritchardia kaalae Rock – Waianae Range Pritchardia (Oahu, Hawaii)
 Pritchardia lanaiensis Becc. & Rock – Lānai Pritchardia  (Lānai, Hawaii)
 Pritchardia lanigera Becc. (Island of Hawaii)
 Pritchardia limahuliensis H.St.John (Kauai, Hawaii)
 Pritchardia lowreyana Rock – Molokai Pritchardia (Molokai, Hawaii)
 Pritchardia maideniana  (Unknown origin, possibly Fiji or Tonga)
 Pritchardia martii (Gaud.) H.Wendl – Koolau Range pritchardia (syn. P. gaudichaudii) (Oahu, Hawaii)
 Pritchardia minor Becc. – Alakai Swamp Pritchardia (Kauai, Hawaii)
 Pritchardia mitiaroana Dransfield & Ehrhardt (Mitiaro, Cook Islands)
 Pritchardia munroi Rock – Kamalo Pritchardia (Molokai, Hawaii)
 Pritchardia napaliensis H.St.John (Kauai, Hawaii)
 Pritchardia pacifica Seem. & H.Wendl. (Fiji, Tonga, Samoa)
 Pritchardia pericularum 
 Pritchardia perlmanii Gemmill (Kauai, Hawaii)
 Pritchardia remota Becc. – Nihoa Pritchardia (Nihoa, Hawaii)
 Pritchardia schattaueri Hodel – Giant Pritchardia (Island of Hawaii)
 Pritchardia thurstonii F.Muell. & Drude (Fiji)
 Pritchardia viscosa Becc. – Stickybud Pritchardia (Kauai, Hawaii)
 Pritchardia vuylstekeana 
 Pritchardia waialealeana R.W.Read (Kauai, Hawaii)
 Pritchardia woodfordiana  (Solomon Islands)
 Pritchardia woodii  (Maui, Hawaii)

Formerly placed here
 Licuala grandis (hort. ex W. Bull) H.Wendl. (as P. grandis hort. ex W. Bull) (Vanuatu)
 Washingtonia filifera (Linden ex André) H.Wendl. (as P. filamentosa H.Wendl. ex Franceschi or P. filifera Linden ex André) (Southwestern United States and Baja California)

See also
Laysan fan palm

References

 Kew Palms Checklist: Pritchardia

External links

 
Arecaceae genera
Oceanian realm flora
Flora of the Solomon Islands (archipelago)